The 2007–08 Canadian network television schedule indicates the fall prime time schedules for Canada's major English and French broadcast networks. For schedule changes after the fall launch, please consult each network's individual article.

Changes
CTVglobemedia's takeover of the A-Channel stations was approved by the CRTC during the summer. As a result, the CTV and A-Channel schedules were adjusted from the original upfronts announcements, with CTV bumping several of its scheduled replacement shows to the secondary system. The fall schedule that actually debuted on A-Channel, in fact, was not fully announced until the end of September 2007, when CTV announced that The Big Bang Theory and Two and a Half Men, both originally scheduled to air on CTV following the end of Dancing with the Stars, would instead premiere on A-Channel in sync with their American launches. CTV also later bumped Dirty Sexy Money and Big Shots to A-Channel, each several weeks after their premieres on CTV.

2007 official fall schedule

Sunday

Monday

Tuesday

Wednesday

Thursday

Friday

Saturday

Top weekly ratings
 Note: English Canadian television only by viewers age 2 and up
 Data sources: BBM Canada official website

References

External links
 BBM Canada Top Weekly Television Ratings

2007 in Canadian television
2008 in Canadian television
Canadian television schedules